Puspa Indah (Beautiful Flower) is a 1980 album by Indonesian singer Chrisye, working in collaboration with Guruh Soekarnoputra. It was his fourth studio album and the third with Musica Studios.

Recording
After the failure of Percik Pesona (Stain of Enchantment; 1979), Chrisye decided to distance himself from the pure pop sound that had made the earlier albums Badai Pasti Berlalu (The Storm Will Surely Pass; 1977) and Sabda Alam (Nature's Order; 1978) successful. After a period of introspection and contemplation, he decided to stick with pop, but give it a romantic theme with easy listening influences.

Guruh Soekarnoputra, songwriter son of former president Sukarno, contributed significantly to the project; he wrote the lyrics for all the songs except "To My Friends on Legian Beach" and "Gita Cinta" ("Love Song"), as well as all the melodies except "Interlude - Kenang-Kenangan" ("Interlude - Memories"). For "To My Friends on Legian Beach", Indonesian poet Sitor Situmorang wrote the lyrics, while Eddy Iskandar handled the lyrics for "Gita Cinta". The melody for "Interlude - Kenang-Kenangan" was written by long-term collaborator Jockie Soerjoprajogo.

Musically, Yockie played the keyboard and harmonica, while Chrisye played the bass and guitar, both electric and acoustic. Roesma of Musica Studios served as recording engineer during the recording sessions in Jakarta.

Release and reception
Prior to the album's release, two of its singles, "Galih dan Ratna" ("Galih and Ratna") and "Gita Cinta" ("Love Song") were selected for inclusion in the 1979 film Gita Cinta dari SMA (Love Song in High School). For marketing, Chrisye took a cameo role in the film as the singer of "Galih dan Ratna". Puspa Indah was released by Musica Studios in mid-1980, with high sales.

The success of Puspa Indah convinced Chrisye that some albums needed to be synergized with other media in order to succeed. Puspa Indah has been reissued twice, once as a CD in 2004 and once as part of the Chrisye Masterpiece Trilogy Limited Edition in 2007. In December 2007, Rolling Stone Indonesia selected Puspa Indah as the 57th best Indonesian album of all time.

Track listing

References
Footnotes

Bibliography

1980 albums
Chrisye albums
Indonesian-language albums